Cheshmeh-ye Sarmandali (also Romanized as Cheshmeh-ye Sarmandalī) is a village in Dokuheh Rural District, Seh Qaleh District, Sarayan County, South Khorasan Province, Iran. At the 2006 census, its population was 55, in 17 families.

References 

Populated places in Sarayan County